An overlap in railway signalling is the length of track beyond a stop signal that is proved to be clear of vehicles in the controls of the previous signal, as a safety margin.

Overview 

Enough braking distance is provided to allow a train to comfortably stop at the stop signal, but should it fail to do so for any reason (fog, smoke, slippery rails, brake failure, inattention by driver, etc.) there is still some distance to allow the train to stop short of any obstruction, such as another train.

Length 

The length of an overlap may be a nominal length, or else calculated on the full emergency braking distance for the gradients and speeds for that particular section of line.

Two signal protection 

If the overlap is long enough to extend from one stop signal to the next, then the effect is to provide two signal protection (or "double blocking"), with the first signal having a full overlap, and the second signal having a short overlap.

With two signal protection, only one track circuit is needed between successive signals. However, overlaps may then be longer than is necessary with an adverse effect on headway.

With one signal protection, there may be two track circuits between successive signals, which has a cost, however headways can be optimised.

Country practice 

Overlap design vary widely with signalling practice in different countries and types of train protection systems. Many countries do not use overlaps at all.

Germany 
In Germany the following distances before entry to a station or another critical point are used:

United Kingdom 
(Typical values)
 Mechanical Signalling: 440 yards (402m)
 3-aspect colour lights: 330 yards (300m)
 4-aspect colour lights: 220 yards (200m)

References 

Railway signalling